Neigh may refer to:
 a type of sound made by horses
 Kenneth Neigh (1908–1996), American church leader

See also 
 Loch Neagh (pronounced nay), a lake in Northern Ireland
 Nigh